Abu Abd-Allah or Abu ‘Abdillāh is the Kunya of:
Husayn ibn Ali
Ja'far al-Sadiq